Şonqar (also, Shongar and Zagyar) is a settlement in Baku, Azerbaijan.  The settlement forms part of the municipality of Qızıldaş in Qaradağ raion.

References 

Populated places in Baku